Colgate Clock may refer to:

Colgate Clock (Indiana), located at a Colgate-Palmolive factory in Clarksville, Indiana and one of the largest clocks in the world
Colgate Clock (Jersey City), an octagonal clock facing the Hudson River near Exchange Place in Jersey City, New Jersey